Strauman Church is a chapel of the Church of Norway in Vågan Municipality in Nordland county, Norway. It is located in the village of Sydalen on the island of Austvågøya. It is an annex chapel in the Gimsøy og Strauman parish which is part of the Lofoten prosti (deanery) in the Diocese of Sør-Hålogaland. The wooden chapel was built in a long church style in 1984. The chapel seats about 125 people.

History
The building was completed in 1984 as a privately owned bedehus (meeting house) called Sydal School Chapel before it was later consecrated as a chapel of the Church of Norway.  The church is located in the old school in Sydalen.

See also
List of churches in Sør-Hålogaland

References

Vågan
Churches in Nordland
Wooden churches in Norway
20th-century Church of Norway church buildings
Churches completed in 1984
1984 establishments in Norway
Long churches in Norway